No Time to Kill is the fourth studio album by American country music singer-songwriter Clint Black. The title is a play on the title of his debut album, Killin' Time.

All Five singles from the album were top ten hits for Black on the Billboard Hot Country Singles & Tracks charts: the title track hit #3; "A Bad Goodbye" (a duet with Wynonna Judd recorded after they toured together for 1993's "Black and Wy" concert tour), hit #2; "State of Mind" also hit #2; "A Good Run of Bad Luck" was a #1 single that was featured in the 1994 film Maverick; and "Half the Man" hit #4. "Tuckered Out" also reached #74 based on unsolicited airplay. No Time to Kill was also Black's fourth consecutive album to be certified at least platinum by the RIAA.

Track listing

Personnel

 Eddie Bayers - drums
 Clint Black - lead vocals, background vocals, harmonica
 Dane Bryant - piano
 Larry Byrom - acoustic guitar
 Lenny Castro - percussion
 Larry Corbett - cello
 Brian Dembow - viola
 Steve Dorff - string arrangements
 Bonnie Douglas - violin
 Jerry Douglas - Dobro
 Stuart Duncan - fiddle
 Paul Franklin - steel guitar
 Tommy Funderbunk - background vocals
 Berj Garabedian - violin
 James Getzoff - violin
 Ed Greene - drums
 Rob Hajacos - fiddle
 Dann Huff - electric guitar
 Wynonna Judd - duet vocals on "A Bad Goodbye"
 Dennis Karmazyn - cello
 Jan Kelley - cello
 Ezra Kliger - violin
 Brian Leonard - violin
 Kenny Loggins - background vocals
 Loy Lyle - violin
 Buell Neidlinger - upright bass
 Maria Newman - violin
 Hayden Nicholas - acoustic guitar
 Barbara Porter - violin
 Steve Real - background vocals
 Matt Rollings - piano
 Timothy B. Schmit - background vocals
 Harry Shirinian - viola
 Harry Shlutz - cello
 Paul Shure - violin
 Leland Sklar - bass guitar
 Spiro Stamos - violin
 Raymond Tischer - viola
 John Wittenberg - violin
 Glenn Worf - bass guitar
 Tibor Zelig - violin
 Mihail Zinovyev - viola

Charts

Weekly charts

Year-end charts

Singles

Other charted songs

References

External links
Black Tracks: No Time to Kill. ClintBlack.com. Retrieved on January 5, 2007.

1993 albums
Clint Black albums
RCA Records albums
Albums produced by James Stroud
Albums produced by Clint Black